Roberta Thornley (born 1985) is a New Zealand photographer. Her work is in the permanent collections of Christchurch Art Gallery and the Sarjeant Gallery.

Biography
Thornley was born in Auckland and studied at Elam School of Fine Arts at the University of Auckland, graduating in 2007. She spent 6 months in Rwanda taking portraits of local people, and when she returned to New Zealand she settled in Whanganui.

In 2014 she received a residency at Tylee Cottage with the Sarjeant Gallery, and spent five months there the following year. Her work is included in collections such as the Real Art Roadshow, Christchurch Art Gallery and the Sarjeant Gallery.

Awards 

 2017: Marti Friedlander Photographic Award
 2011: Auckland Festival of Photography Annual Commission

References

Living people
1985 births
New Zealand women photographers
Artists from Auckland
Artists from Whanganui
University of Auckland alumni
New Zealand photographers
21st-century women photographers
Photographers from Auckland